Roque Gonzales is a municipality located in the northwestern region of the southernmost state of Rio Grande do Sul, Brazil, east of the Uruguay River and the Argentinian border. Roque Gonzales was named after the jesuit missionary and saint Roque González de Santa Cruz.

The municipality would be partially flooded by the proposed Garabí Dam.

Neighboring municipalities
Porto Xavier
São Paulo das Missões
São Pedro do Butiá
Rolador
São Luiz Gonzaga
Dezesseis de Novembro
Pirapó

History
Primarily German-Brazilians or Deutschbrasilianer from the old colonized areas of the state of Rio Grande do Sul settled Roque Gonzales. The original German settlements whence they came were often referred to as Altkolonie because they are located on the eastern part of the state where Germans first put down roots, starting in 1824 (i.e. Estrela, Montenegro, Lajeado, etc.).

East Pomeranian has been spoken in Esquina Emanuel since the early days of its foundation because it was settled by immigrants of Pomeranian descent. Dona Otília was settled primarily by Lutherans. Typically most of the German speakers in the municipality and in the wider region spoke Riograndenser Hunsrückisch and identified with the Roman Catholic tradition and customs. In 2012 the state chamber of deputies voted unanimously in favor of recognizing this Germanic dialect an official historical culture good to be preserved.

The book is about the relationship of a grandfather, the author, with his first grandson. It has received positive reviews and has been classified by some as a book for all ages.

The Premio Missões of literature of Roque Gonzales is headed by João Weber Griebeler of Igaçaba Produções Culturais and it covers mostly Brazilian literature but some works in other languages are also occasionally published (collective anthology). Griebeler also is the editor of the local newspaper, the Jornal Igaçaba.

Roque Gonzales is located near the margins of the Rio Ijuí. Not too far south from the town the river turns into a wide waterfall: Salto Pirapó. Camping is available in the area. It is a great place for bird watching, hiking a relaxation. This is also the location of a small hydroelectric plant built almost one hundred years ago and a fixture in local history. Two new hydroelectric plants have been built on the Ijuí river within the general region.

See also
 Sepé Tiaraju
 São Miguel das Missões
 Jesuits
 Guarani people

References

External links
 Roque Gonzales official site (in Portuguese)
 Roque Gonzales – Cerro Inhacurutum (in Portuguese)

German-Brazilian culture 
Languages of Brazil
Municipalities in Rio Grande do Sul